is a Japanese visual novel series by HuneX and Comfort. The first game was released on October 27, 2011, for the PlayStation Portable (PSP). A fan disc also for the PSP titled  was released on June 21, 2012, featuring two new characters: Ash and Joshua. A spin-off cooking game titled  was released on December 13, 2012. The first game has been adapted into a manga and anime series along with various franchise-related merchandise such as drama CDs, music CDs, and fanbooks, etc.

Plot
There is an organization called the Arcana Famiglia, which protects the island of Regalo (Italian for "gift" or "present"). The Famiglia is made up of people who have made contracts with Arcana cards, and have received special abilities due to this. On his birthday celebration, Mondo has decided it is time for him to retire and give up his title to a new boss who has control over an Arcana. To decide who in the "family" gets this title, he calls for a tournament, called the Arcana Duello, between Arcana users. To the winner, he promises the title of "Papa", a wish of the winner's choice and his daughter's hand in marriage. Refusing to accept this, Felicità decides to fight to choose her own path, with Libertà and Nova fighting for her freedom by her side.

Characters

Regalo

The only daughter of Arcana Famiglia's boss, Mondo, as well as the leader of Sword and the protagonist of the games. Bears a contract with #6 of the Arcana - The Lovers, makes her able to read people's hearts and later, she finds out that she has another Arcana - The Wheel of Fortune (#10), makes her able to change the relationship of a tarocco and the host in it. Most Arcana Famiglia members call her "Milady". She is strict on herself and others and always strives, but is also a bit innocent and pure in some ways. She is always accompanied by her owl, Fukulota. She is also noted to be a strong, excellent fighter. During the games, she is able to defeat all of the other members except for Libertà and Nova, who she never got a chance to fight against. Libertà and Nova lost consciousness during their battle against each other and were unable to continue participating in the games. Thus Felicità fights her father and wins the duello. She wishes for her father to continue as the Papa of the Arcana Famiglia.

Bears a contract with #0 of the Arcana - The Fool, also the member of Intelligence. He calls Felicità "Princess". He loves masked heroes and admired Dante very much. A boy who is always curious and loves new things. He believes himself to be a Man of the Sea, and he is even more impulsive than Felicità. His memories got sealed by Dante because of his Arcana power went uncontrollable and he was also the reason why Dante went bald. His Arcana Mark is on his forehead with the power to make whatever he says happen. He cares a lot for Felicità.

 Bears a contract with #13 of the Arcana - Death and the leader of Holy Grail. He is Felicità's cousin and Mondo's nephew. His father, Moreno, is Mondo's older brother. He calls Felicità "Fel", which is his nickname for her. Libertà calls him "chickpea" due to his short stature. His Arcana sign is on the back of his neck and his power is to put people in sleep. He is talented despite his young age and because of this, stands at the top of his division. He put his parents into a deep eternal sleep when he overheard them plotting rebellion against Mondo and Sumire, so Nova would be the leader instead. But later, with the help of Felicità and also Mondo, he is able to wake them up again. He was engaged to Felicità when they were young but after the incident with his parents, he broke off the engagement. However, he still cares for her and is still in love with her.

Bears a contract with #9 of the Arcana - The Hermit, his ability is to make himself invisible with the Arcana Mark on his foot, near his ankle. Bipolar leader of Coins who hates to be tied and loves to flirt, including Felicità. He has a foul mouth, but he is actually a good big brother figure. He covered his right eye with an eye-patch to cover his artificial eye that is used to control his Arcana power, made by Jolly. Debito calls Felicità "Bambina", which means "little girl" in Italian.

Bears a contract with #11 of the Arcana - Strength, which makes his strength akin to that of a monster and has an Arcana Mark on his hand. Like Libertà, he also calls Felicità "Princess". He loves lasagna very much and has very bad eyesight. He is the leader of the Wands, and is the cheerful mood-maker of the Family. When the director is away, he also acts as Substitute Captain, which involves handling negotiations and managing the different divisions and the civilians, though usually he uses his fist better than his mouth.

Felicità's personal attendant. The bearer of Arcana Temperance (#14) and has the Mark on his tongue. He, Debito and Pace are old friends. He is Jolly's pupil as well as his son. He's been taking care of Felicità ever since she was a child.  He’s amazing at all things domestic, including cooking. He also trained Felicità, is rather clingy with Felicità, and worries about her too much. It sometimes seems that he likes Felicità more than a friend. He loves to tinker with alchemy. At the end of the manga, Luca and Felicità profess their love for one another.

The director of the Arcana Famiglia and the bearer of The Emperor (#4) and his power is to remove or manipulate memories. He is also the leader of Intelligence. He's a former pirate who was taken in by Mondo. A very reliable and one of the most trustworthy people in the Family, and made him very popular with the people. He’s like a father to Libertà since the time he saved him. His Arcana Mark is on his head.

Mondo's right-hand man, and the second highest ranking member in the Family who bears Arcana - The Moon (#18) with a Mark on his right eye. His power lets him forcibly draw out a person's memory. He is the family advisor, but because of his cold-hearted and emotionless actions and words, almost everyone on the island avoids him as the very incarnation of terror. He is also the best at Alchemy on the island. He is also Luca's father, though his actual age is unknown. His main weapon is Alchemy. He was born on March 8th with the horoscope of Pisces. He is 184 cm high and has the hobby of experimenting. He is voiced by Tomo Muranaka as a kid.

A new character in Arcana Famiglia: Vascello Phantasma no Majutsushi. Bears a contract with #01 of the Arcana - The Magician. He is introduced with Joshua in Vascello Fantasma no Majutsushi. He appears in Arcana Famiglia sequel, Arcana Famiglia 2.

 (Arcana Famiglia), Yūichi Iguchi (Arcana Famiglia 2)
An artificial child created and raised by Jolly. In spite of his young age, he has a contract with The Tower, Arcana (#16). He becomes capturable character in Arcana Famiglia 2. Elmo first appears in the anime television series in episode 3, Piccolino.

Bears a contract with #21 of the Arcana - The World. Felicità's father and the boss of Arcana Famiglia. Everyone in the organization calls him "Papa".  He may be harsh at times, but he is really a frank and good-natured guy. He is also one of those fathers who can’t say no to their daughters, until the Arcana Duello comes along when he wanted Felicità to be more reliable as the lady or getting married with his reliable companions.

The mother of Felicità and does fortunetelling for the Family with her Judgement Arcana (#20). Everyone in the family calls her "Mama". She has a mysterious air around her, but she is a refined lady. Like Mondo, though, she has a doting aspect to her personality for her daughter, despite giving her a strict upbringing.

Nordia

New character in Arcana Famiglia 2.

New character in Arcana Famiglia 2.

New character in Arcana Famiglia 2.

New character in Arcana Famiglia 2.

New character in Arcana Famiglia 2.

Others

A new character in Arcana Famiglia: Vascello Phantasma no Majutsushi. Bears a contract with #08 of the Arcana - Justice. A video game character only. Joshua is Mondo's son, Libertà's father and Felicità's half-brother.

Adaptations

Manga
A manga based on the game, titled Arcana Famiglia: Amore Mangiare Cantare!, began publishing in the comic magazine Sylph in 2011. The manga features art by Ruru (Artist).

Anime
An anime adaptation produced by J.C.Staff began airing in July 2012. The anime is licensed by Sentai Filmworks in North America. The series originally aired from July 1, 2012, to September 16, 2012; with direction by Chiaki Kon, character design by Mai Matsuura and art direction by Takahiro Yokeda. The anime series follows Felicità, the only daughter of Mondo, the soon-to-be-retired boss of the mafia organization Arcana Famiglia. Mondo creates a tournament among the Arcana users to determine the new heir to the organization. However, as Felicità unfortunately learns that the prize of the tournament includes her to be betrothed to the winner, she decides to join this tournament herself and choose her own path, receiving support from Libertà and Nova to achieve her goal. The opening song for the anime was "Magenta Another Sky" by Hitomi Harada, while the ending was "Pieces of Treasure" by Jun Fukuyama and Tsubasa Yonaga, who voice Libertà and Nova respectively.

From the second to seventh episode, one of Arcana Famiglia members is forced to do something as punishment for breaking a rule of the mansion.

Other media

A light novel, Arcana Famiglia: La Primavera was published by Filia Bunko, a label of Frontier Works. Frontier Works also published a series of drama CDs for the franchise.

Staff and Development

The character designer and main artist for the games is Yomi Sarachi. She also did character design for the comic version and illustrations for the novel. Both the openings for the first game and the fan disc are sung by Hitomi Harada, while the endings of the first game are sung by the voice actor whose character's route has been completed.

Reception
The fan disc Vascello Phantasma no Majutsushi sold 4,854 copies in the first four days it was sold, making it the fifteenth best selling console game in Japan that week.

Carlo Santos of Anime News Network (ANN) reviewed the first half of the anime series. Santos commended the top-notch action scenes and character designs for making the cast look distinct from one another but criticized both the animation and backgrounds for being "a mixed bag of genuine effort and cost-cutting laziness" and the filler approach to storytelling that may cause viewers to lose interest before the second-half of the series. Fellow ANN editor Rebecca Silverman reviewed the complete anime series in 2014. While giving praise to the Italian setting and the characterization of both Libertà and Nova, Silverman felt that Felicità lacked development amongst her harem and the overall plot only acted as bookends to the mid-portion adaptation of the game's events. She concluded that devoted harem fans will enjoy aspects of the series but cautioned others to look elsewhere for the action, rom-com story it promised in the beginning.

References

External links
HuneX's official Arcana Famiglia franchise portal 
Comfort Soft's official site for the Arcana Famiglia game 

Comfort Soft's official site for Arcana Famiglia -Vascello Phantasma no Majutsushi- 

Anime official website 

2011 video games
2012 anime television series debuts
Adventure anime and manga
Anime television series based on video games
ASCII Media Works manga
HuneX games
J.C.Staff
Japan-exclusive video games
Male harem anime and manga
Manga based on video games
Otome games
PlayStation Portable games
PlayStation Portable-only games
Romance anime and manga
Sentai Filmworks
Shōjo manga
Video games developed in Japan
Visual novels